The Thị Vải River is a river of Vietnam. It flows for 76 kilometres through Bà Rịa–Vũng Tàu province and Đồng Nai province.

References

Rivers of Bà Rịa-Vũng Tàu province
Rivers of Đồng Nai province
Rivers of Vietnam